Jin Ju-Dong (born 14 August 1972) is a Korean former wrestler who competed in the 2000 Summer Olympics.

References

External links
 

1972 births
Living people
Olympic wrestlers of North Korea
Wrestlers at the 2000 Summer Olympics
North Korean male sport wrestlers
Asian Games medalists in wrestling
Wrestlers at the 1998 Asian Games
Medalists at the 1998 Asian Games
Asian Games gold medalists for North Korea
20th-century North Korean people
21st-century North Korean people